Cloverhill (or Clover Hill) is an unincorporated community located at the intersection of the boundaries of East Amwell and Raritan townships in Hunterdon County and Hillsborough Township in Somerset County, in New Jersey, United States. The Clover Hill Historic District was listed on the state and national registers of historic places in 1980.

History
John Bennett purchased several hundred acres of land here in 1683. The Clover Hill Reformed Church was built in 1834 as a Dutch Reformed Church. By the late 19th century, the community had a hotel, store, church, blacksmith and post office. The community is named after Peter Clover, a blacksmith who worked across from the church.

Historic district

The Clover Hill Historic District is a  historic district encompassing the community along Amwell and Wertsville-Clover Hill Roads. It was added to the National Register of Historic Places on September 29, 1980, for its significance in religion and exploration/settlement. The district includes 21 contributing buildings.

The Clover Hill Reformed Church features short spires on the corners in the Gothic Revival style. The steeple was replaced in 1885 after having been blown down. The J. B. French House was built in 1873 with Greek Revival style. The E. Bartow Farm / John Cruser House was built in three stages, starting . It features kneewall windows on the third floor.

References

External links
 

East Amwell Township, New Jersey
Raritan Township, New Jersey
Hillsborough Township, New Jersey
Unincorporated communities in Hunterdon County, New Jersey
Unincorporated communities in Somerset County, New Jersey
Unincorporated communities in New Jersey
National Register of Historic Places in Hunterdon County, New Jersey
National Register of Historic Places in Somerset County, New Jersey
Historic districts on the National Register of Historic Places in New Jersey
New Jersey Register of Historic Places